Wighill is a village and civil parish in the Harrogate district of North Yorkshire, England. The village has one public house, the White Swan Inn, which reopened in 2009 after a two-year closure.

Uhtred the Bold was murdered here in 1016.

History

In 1016, Uhtred was slain at a place called Wicheal by Cnut and a band of several men who had lain in wait for Uhtred. Several people have suggested that Wicheal is wighill. The village is mentioned in the Domesday Book as belonging to Geoffrey Alselin, and having 18 villagers and nine ploughlands. The name of the village is recorded as deriving from the Old English wic-halh, a nook of land with a dairy farm. The south end of the parish borders a meander of the River Wharfe. The old township was sometimes referred to as Wighill-cum-Esedyke, a reference to a place called Easdyke just west of the village, which had a drain into the river. One of the descendants of the Stapleton family recorded his belief that the name could be derived from Battle-hill, but that it was more likely to have meant a village set on a hill overlooking the windings [of the River Wharfe].

The village was historically in the wapentake of Ainsty, and formerly it was in the West Riding of Yorkshire. It was moved into North Yorkshire with the 1974 county boundary changes. Wighill Park, to the north-west of the village, was historically the county seat of the Stapleton family, but by the 19th century, it had been sold on.

The Church of All Saints, the Anglican place of worship in the village, is a grade I listed building which has 12th and 15th century origins. A vicarage and tithes were first recorded for Al Saints in the year 1288. The pub in the village was closed in 2007, and re-opened in 2009. It also serves as the local polling station on various voting days.

Governance 
The village is now in the Harrogate District of North Yorkshire, and is in the Selby and Ainsty for national government purposes.

Notable people
John Dawson (1871–1948), cricketer
Thomas de Mowbray, 4th Earl of Norfolk, lord of Wighill in the late 14th century, beheaded in York in 1405
Bryan Stapleton, a knight who bought the estate at Wighill in 1376
Philip Stapleton (1603–1647), Member of Parliament during the English Civil War
Rev. George Walker, 1618–1690, fought in the Battle of the Boyne in Ireland, and died on the battlefield.

Location grid

References

Sources

External links

Villages in North Yorkshire
Civil parishes in North Yorkshire